General Power may refer to:

Ash Power (born 1957), Australian Army lieutenant general
Manley Power (1773–1826), British Army major general
Thomas S. Power (1905–1970), U.S. Air Force general

See also
Attorney General Power (disambiguation)